Jōnan-ku, Fukuoka, ward in Fukuoka, Japan
 Jōnan Line, light rail line in Matsuyama, Japan
 Ignasius Jonan, Indonesian politician
 21254 Jonan, minor planet